Orania carnicolor is a species of sea snail, a marine gastropod mollusk in the family Muricidae, the murex snails or rock snails.

Description

Distribution
This marine species occurs off Madagascar.

References

 Bozzetti, L., 2009. - Muricopsis carnicolor (Gastropoda: Hypsogastropoda: Muricidae: Muricopsinae) nuova specie dal Madagascar meridionale. Malacologia Mostra Mondiale 64: 19
 Houart, R.: Zuccon, D. & Puillandre, N. (2019). Description of new genera and new species of Ergalataxinae (Gastropoda: Muricidae). Novapex. 20 (Hors série 12): 1-52.

Gastropods described in 2009
Orania (gastropod)